Joshua S. Porter, better known by his stage name Josh Dies (born June 12, 1983) is an American singer, songwriter, musician and novelist. Porter is widely known as the vocalist and songwriter for the band Showbread.

Music career
In 1997, Joshua Porter joined his brother Patrick as part of the band Showbread, which became a full-time international touring act in 2002. In 2004, following several independent albums, Showbread released No Sir, Nihilism Is Not Practical through Tooth & Nail Records. The band released several more albums and went through several lineup changes; Porter has been the lead singer and songwriter through every incarnation.

Showbread released one final album, Showbread is Showdead, before disbanding in 2016. Porter and other members of the band went on to form the worship group Church of Agony and the synth-punk trio The Bell Jar.

Porter has also released two albums as industrial electronic act DIES, Aesthetics of Violence and Scalene.

Writing
Porter released his first novel, The Spinal Cord Perception, in December 2006. Porter no longer promotes the novel as he is no longer satisfied with it. Other works by Porter include the novels Nevada, its sequel An Edict of Worms, and Cannibals, Showbread biography The Joke That We Play on The World, children's book The Insect, and comic series The Black Meat. Porter's most recent novel is Punk Rock vs. the Lizard People.

Other work
Porter has designed artwork for Sylvia Massy Shivy's Psycho Empire T-shirt line. He is one of the hosts of film podcast You Hate Movies and a founding member of Van City Church in Washington.

Personal life
Joshua Porter married Abigail Martinez on November 11, 2007. His three favorite bands are Nine Inch Nails, The Flaming Lips, and Genesis, and his screaming style is influenced by Dennis Lyxzén's trademark scream. Porter's novels feature a dark, postmodern style similar to Chuck Palahniuk, Bret Easton Ellis, and many other Generation X novelists. Nevada in particular is influenced by Palahniuk's epistolary novel Rant.

Porter has stated that he is an "anti-patriotic, pacifistic, anarchist type Christian." According to Porter, "As a Christian, I believe that for all Christians, violent self-defense is contrary to Jesus’ teachings, even within the confines of government," and "[t]he New Testament is very clear in forbidding violence, retaliation and revenge.

Porter is an admirer of theologian Greg Boyd, and identifies with the teachings of open theism.

Controversy
Porter has been involved with several controversies having to do with his work, namely with some Christian groups who feel that some of the subject matter of his writing is contrary to Porter's personal stance of faith as a devout Christian. Some of his lyrics are tinged with dark, violent, and obscure subject matter. Porter has been open in sharing his ideas about accusations brought against him and his work, and has posted several articles dealing with these topics on Showbread's website.

Discography

With Showbread
 The Dissonance of Discontent (1998)
 Goodbye Is Forever (1999)
 Human Beings Are Too Shallow to Fall in Love (2000)
 Goodnight Sweetheart, The Stitches Are Coming Apart (2001)
 Life, Kisses, and Other Wasted Efforts (2003, Steel Roots Records)
 No Sir, Nihilism Is Not Practical (2004, Tooth & Nail/Solid State Records)
 Age of Reptiles (2006, Tooth & Nail Records)
 Anorexia and Nervosa (2008, Tooth & Nail Records)
 The Fear of God (2009)
 Who Can Know It? (2010)
 Cancer (2012)
 Showbread Is Showdead (2016)

As DIES
 DIES – Aesthetics of Violence (2007)
 DIES – Talons (2009)
 DIES – Scalene (2011)

Other projects
 Knife to Meet You – Three Track Demo Tape (2009)
 Church Of Agony - "O Come, All Ye Faithful" [EP] (2016)
 Church of Agony – Protest! Worship! Lament! (2017)
 Church of Agony - "It Came Upon the Midnight Clear" [Single] (2017)
 The Bell Jar – I Infest, Therefore I Am (2018)
 Annihilationism - "White Lies, Black Death" [Single] (2020)

Bibliography
The Spinal Cord Perception (2006)
The Insect (2009)
The Black Meat (2010)
Remission (2010)
Nevada (2010)
The Joke That We Play on the World (2011)
An Edict Of Worms (2011)
Cannibals, Book One: Iambic Pentameter and the Teaching of Twelve (2013)
Punk Rock vs. the Lizard People (2019)

References

External links
Official Site
Joshua S. Porter Myspace page
Showbread official site
Purevolume page
Showbread Myspace page
DIES Myspace page

1983 births
Living people
21st-century American male writers
21st-century American novelists
21st-century American singers
21st-century American male singers
21st-century Methodists
American male novelists
American Methodists
American performers of Christian music
American punk rock musicians
American rock singers
American rock songwriters
American male singer-songwriters
Christians from Georgia (U.S. state)
Hardcore punk musicians
Musicians from Savannah, Georgia
Novelists from Georgia (U.S. state)
Performers of Christian rock music
Postmodern writers
Writers from Savannah, Georgia
Singer-songwriters from Georgia (U.S. state)
American anarchists